is a passenger railway station located in the city of Kawagoe, Saitama, Japan, operated by the private railway operator Tōbu Railway.

Lines
All services, (TJ Liner, Rapid express, Express, Semi express, Local) stop at this station except for the two morning up TJ Liner services for Ikebukuro.

Station layout
The station has two island platforms serving four tracks. The station building and entrance is located on the east side. A new footbridge providing lift access was added during fiscal 2010.

Two storage tracks are located between the running lines north of the station for use by trains terminating at this station. On the west side of the station lies the Kawagoe maintenance depot, which is responsible for minor overhauls of Tojo Line rolling stock.

Platforms

Platform 2 is generally used for trains terminating at this station, and platform 3 is generally used for trains starting from this station.

History

It was renamed Kawagoeshi Station on 1 December 1922.

Through-running to and from  via the Tokyo Metro Fukutoshin Line commenced on 14 June 2008.

From 17 March 2012, station numbering was introduced on the Tōbu Tōjō Line, with Kawagoeshi Station becoming "TJ-22".

Passenger statistics
In fiscal 2019, the station was used by an average of 47,600 passengers daily.  The passenger figures for previous years are as shown below.

Surrounding area

Other stations
 Hon-Kawagoe Station (Seibu Shinjuku Line), approximately 5 minutes' walk

Civic

 Kawagoe City Office
 Kawagoe City Library
 Kawagoe City Museum
 Kawagoe City Art Museum
 Kawagoe Municipal Swimming Pool

Temples and shrines
 Kita-in Temple
 Hikawa Shrine

Education
 Saitama Prefectural Kawagoe High School 
 Saitama Prefectural Kawagoe Girls' Senior High School 
 Yamamura Gakuen High School
 Hoshino High School
 Kawagoe Fujimi Junior High School

Commercial
 Bushu Gas head office
 Kawagoe Prince Hotel
 Kawagoe Tobu Hotel

See also
 List of railway stations in Japan

References

External links

  

Tobu Tojo Main Line
Stations of Tobu Railway
Railway stations in Kawagoe, Saitama
Railway stations in Japan opened in 1914